Binding waste is damaged, misprinted, or surplus paper or parchment reused in bookbinding. Whether as whole sheets or fragments (disjecta membra), these may be used as the exterior binding, as the endpapers, or as a reinforcement beneath the spine.

Especially in medieval and early modern bookbinding, it was common to use discarded or defective sheets to reinforce bindings, even if they had already been used for writing or printing. This practice has led to the survival of texts which may otherwise have been lost. Binding waste can also help to provide a date, and in some cases a location, for the manuscript or printed texts which it accompanies.

Binder's waste, derived from discarded books, has been distinguished from 'printer's waste' (proofs and misprinted sheets) and 'bookseller's waste'.

See also 
 Fragmentology, the study of manuscript fragments
 Palimpsest, a manuscript page reused to write another document

References

Further reading 

 Jessica Leigh Hester, The Surprising Practice of Binding Old Books With Scraps of Even Older Books, Atlas Obscura (June 11, 2018)
 Elizabeth Ryan, Hidden treasures: Encounters with binder's waste in Stanford Libraries Conservation Department, Stanford Libraries Blog (April 2, 2020)
Rita Udina, Disjecta membra and recycled bookbindings (October, 2021)

Bookbinding
Repurposing